The third series of The Valleys, a British television programme based in Cardiff, Wales was confirmed in July 2013 after cast member Leeroy announced it on Twitter. It is expected to air on 25 February 2014 on MTV. This will be the first series not to include cast members Leeroy Reed and Liam Powell, who made their final appearances during Series 2. On 14 January, the new cast member was confirmed as Jack Watkins, a 24-year-old stripper. It was also announced that The Valleys club branded nights "Valleywood Nights" would be going on tour to various locations around the UK and Ireland including Liverpool, Bristol and Dublin. Despite originally being dropped from the show, Nicole announced she'd be returning for the third series.

Storylines
Anthony, Carley, Chidgey, Jason, Jenna and Natalee return to the house and are then joined by Lateysha who makes a grand entrance on a horse. During their first night out in Cardiff, Carley takes a shine to the new butler, Jack leaving Chidgey jealous. The next morning the group are asked to return to the Valleys to meet AK and Jordan for work. As the group all return from work they're shocked to be greeted by Jack, who announces that he's their new housemate. Carley, Jenna and Lateysha all compete for Jack's attention causing Chidgey to get angry. Jason accidentally tells Natalee that Anthony cheated on her in Australia leaving her upset and doubting the relationship. Chidgey is far from impressed after finding out that everyone will learn how to strip for Valleywood nights, and is even less impressed to be taught by Jack. Following another night where the girls compete for Jack's attention, it's Jenna that catches his eye, but she reveals she doesn't want to be second best to anyone so rejects him. Nicole returns to the house, but is left disappointed when no one answers the door.

Cast
Anthony Suminski
Carley Belmonte
Darren Chidgey
Jack Watkins
Jason Suminski
Jenna Jonathan
Lateysha Grace
Natalee Harris
Nicole Morris

Duration of cast

Notes 

Key:  = "Cast Member" is featured in this episode.
Key:  = "Cast Member" arrives in the house.
Key:  = "Cast Member" voluntarily leaves the house.
Key:  = "Cast Member" is removed from the house.
Key:  = "Cast Member" returns to the house.
Key:  = "Cast Member" features in this episode, but outside of the house.
Key:  = "Cast Member" does not feature in this episode.
Key:  = "Cast Member" returns to the series.
Key:  = "Cast Member" leaves the series.
Key:  = "Cast Member" features in this episode despite not being an official cast member at the time.

Episodes

{| class="wikitable plainrowheaders" style="width:100%"
|-style="color:white"
! style="background:#F781D8;"| SeriesNo.
! style="background:#F781D8;"| EpisodeNo.
! style="background:#F781D8;"| Title
! style="background:#F781D8;"| Original air date
! style="background:#F781D8;"| Duration
! style="background:#F781D8;"| UK viewers

|}

Ratings

References

2013 British television seasons